The 1955 Icelandic Basketball Tournament was the 4th season of the top tier men's basketball league in Iceland. The season started on 18 March 1955 and ended on 25 March 1955. ÍR won its second title by posting the best record in the league.

Competition format
The participating teams played each other once for a total of 3 games. The top team won the national championship.

Results

|}

Table

References

External links
Official Icelandic Basketball Federation website

Lea
Úrvalsdeild karla (basketball)